Career (Swedish: Karriär) is a 1938 Swedish drama film directed by Schamyl Bauman and starring Signe Hasso, Sture Lagerwall and  Tollie Zellman. The film's sets were designed by the art director Erwin Scharf. It follows the members of a touring theatre company.

Cast
 Signe Hasso as 	Monika Hall
 Sture Lagerwall as 	Erik Norrby
 Tollie Zellman as 	Nanny Högfelt
 Carl Barcklind as Ferdinand Sund
 Ruth Stevens as 	Karin Lund
 Olof Widgren as 	Helge Berg
 Olof Sandborg as Theater Manager 
 Wiola Brunius a s	Margit Larsson 
 Mona Mårtenson as Actress
 Ludde Gentzel as Johansson
 Ragnar Widestedt as 	Lindell
 Gösta Cederlund as 	Malte Brundin Senior
 Sigge Fürst as 	Bus Driver
 Douglas Håge as 	Rydman, Theater Manager
 Åke Engfeldt as Malte Brundin Junior
 Hartwig Fock as 	Man at Railroad Crossing 
 Gustaf Färingborg as Pelle Söderström, Actor 
 Torsten Hillberg as 	Man
 Elsa Holmquist as 	Lena Moberg, Actress
 Bellan Roos as 	Landlady
 Lillebil Kjellén as 	Young Woman 
 Arne Lindblad as 	Andersson, Janitor 
 Signe Lundberg-Settergren as 	Landlady 
 Aurore Palmgren as 	Prompter 
 Eric von Gegerfelt as 	Maitre d' 
 Birger Åsander as 	Man in the Audience

References

Bibliography 
 Gustafsson, Fredrik. The Man from the Third Row: Hasse Ekman, Swedish Cinema and the Long Shadow of Ingmar Bergman. Berghahn Books, 2016.
 Hjort, Mette & Lindqvist, Ursula. A Companion to Nordic Cinema. John Wiley & Sons, 2016.

External links 
 

1938 films
Swedish drama films
1938 drama films
1930s Swedish-language films
Films directed by Schamyl Bauman
1930s Swedish films